Fire in the Blood (Spanish: Fuego en la sangre) is a 1953 Spanish drama film directed by Ignacio F. Iquino and starring Antonio Vilar and Marisa de Leza. It was made by the Barcelona-based IFI Producción.

The film's art director was Miguel Lluch.

Synopsis 
The film narrates the love triangle between Juan Fernando, the foreman of a ranch of wild cattle, Soledad and her fiancé. During a fight with the girl's boyfriend, Juan Fernando's wife dies of a heart attack. The madness of the man unleashes a tragedy.

Cast
Conchita Bautista
Antonio Casas

Modesto Cid
Marisa de Leza
Margarita de Mayo
Juan Gamero
Angelita Gelán
Igna Gil
Luis Induni

Consuelo de Nieva
Miguel Paparelli as Pulpero  
María Dolores Pradera
Antonio Vilar

References

External links

1953 drama films
Spanish drama films
Films directed by Ignacio F. Iquino
Films with screenplays by Ignacio F. Iquino
Films produced by Ignacio F. Iquino
Spanish black-and-white films
Films scored by Augusto Algueró
1950s Spanish films
1950s Spanish-language films